The Walter Dean Myers Award for Outstanding Children's Literature, known as "The Walters,” was created by the American nonprofit We Need Diverse Books (WNDB) in 2014, and the inaugural award was presented in 2016. Named after young adult author Walter Dean Myers, the award recognizes published, diverse authors who champion marginalized voices in their stories. The awards program is managed by WNDB's co-directors Kathie Weinberg and Terry Hong. In 2018, WNDB changed the categories from a single category of young adult titles to two categories of teen and young readers. Subsequent awards include both categories.

Recipients

References 

Awards established in 2014
American literary awards
21st-century literary awards
English-language literary awards